Obscure may refer to:

Heraclitus of Ephesus was called "The Obscure"
Obscure (video game), a 2004 survival horror game
Obscure (band), a Bangladeshi pop rock band
Obscure Records, a 1975–1978 UK label founded by Brian Eno
"Obscure", a song by Dir en grey from Vulgar

See also 
Obscure vowel, a type of weak or reduced vowel sound
Obscurity (disambiguation)
Obscure means unknown or strange